Phytoecia annulicornis is a species of beetle in the family Cerambycidae. It was described by Reiche in 1877. It is known from Spain and Morocco.

References

Phytoecia
Beetles described in 1877